Mauritia carana is a species of flowering plant in the family Arecaceae. It is found in Brazil, Colombia, Peru, and Venezuela.

References

carana
Flora of the Amazon
Conservation dependent plants
Trees of Peru
Trees of Brazil
Trees of Venezuela
Trees of Colombia
Taxonomy articles created by Polbot